Canadian Presbyterian Mission was a Presbyterian Church in Canada missionary society that was involved in sending workers to countries such as Trinidad and Tobago during British rule and China during the late Qing Dynasty, the most famous of which were Jonathan Goforth and his wife, Rosalind.

See also

Protestant missionary societies in China during the 19th Century
Timeline of Chinese history
19th-century Protestant missions in China
List of Protestant missionaries in China
Christianity in China
Presbyterian Church in Canada
United Church of Canada

References

Bibliography

Christian missions in China
Canadian Presbyterian missionaries
Presbyterian Church in Canada
Canadian